Julen Rementería del Puerto (born 21 July 1961) is a Mexican politician currently serving as a senator from Veracruz in the LXIV Legislature of the Mexican Congress. He is affiliated with the National Action Party.

Early life 
Rementería del Puerto was born on 21 July 1961.

Political career 
On 30 November 2016, the governor-elect of Veracruz, Miguel Ángel Yunes Linares, announced that Rementería del Puerto would serve in his administration's cabinet as the head of the state's Ministry of Infrastructure and Public Works. Rementería del Puerto served until 8 February 2018, when he resigned his position to run for the Senate of the Republic.

Rementería del Puerto was assigned the Senate first minority seat of Veracruz in the LXIV Legislature on behalf of the National Action Party–Party of the Democratic Revolution coalition following the 2018 general election, replacing . He represents the state alongside senators Ricardo Ahued Bardahuil and Rocío Nahle García.

Committee assignments 
Rementería del Puerto is a member of the following Senate committees:

 Committee on Communications and Transportation
 Committee on Constitutional Matters
 Committee on Energy (Secretary)
 Committee on Hydraulic Resources
 Committee on Regulations and Parliamentary Practices (President)

References 

1961 births
21st-century Mexican politicians
Living people
National Action Party (Mexico) politicians
Politicians from Veracruz
Senators of the LXIV and LXV Legislatures of Mexico
Members of the Congress of Veracruz
Members of the Senate of the Republic (Mexico) for Veracruz